Schnakenbeck's searsid (Sagamichthys schnakenbecki) is a species of fish in the family Platytroctidae (tubeshoulders).

It was named by Gerhard Krefft (1912–1993), who named it for his supervisor Werner Schnakenbeck.

Description

Schnakenbeck's searsid has a long and slender body (maximum ), dark in colour, with a short snout. It has 27–32 gill rakers, 7 or 8 branchiostegal rays and 9–11 pyloric caeca. The dorsal fin is far back, the pelvic fins behind the midpoint and the anal fin further back. It has photophores and a lateral line.

Habitat

References

Platytroctidae
Fish described in 1953
Taxa named by Gerhard Krefft